Shree Radha Damodar Gyan Jyoti Sanskrit Secondary School is a government Higher Secondary school at Rimaldihi in Sankhar VDC, Syangja District, Nepal. Established in 2037 B.S. with initiation from local village leaders, it has served continuously to the development of education and literacy in the area.

The school spreads over an area of 150,000 square meters with a large playground for the students to play and do interactive activities in the break-time.

See also
List of schools in Nepal

References

Secondary schools in Nepal